María Teresa Valdés (11 April 1961 – 1 June 2003) was a Spanish archer. She competed in the women's individual event at the 1988 Summer Olympics.

References

1961 births
2003 deaths
Spanish female archers
Olympic archers of Spain
Archers at the 1988 Summer Olympics
People from Siero